"Chicken Teriyaki" (stylized in all caps) is a song by Spanish singer and songwriter Rosalía. It was released on 24 February 2022 through Columbia Records, as the third single from her third studio album Motomami (2022). The song was written by Rosalía, Raúl Alejandro, Qukaracho, Kamaal Fareed, El Guincho, Michael Uzowuru, and Sky Rompiendo, with the last three also serving as producers alongside the performer and Noah Goldstein.

Background
Rosalía teased "Chicken Teriyaki" for the first time through TikTok on 16 February and confirmed its release as a promotional single the week after.

Composition
"Chicken Teriyaki" is a "difficult, enjoyment social gathering" mid-tempo "TikTok-ready" reggaeton track that runs for two minutes and two seconds. Conceived at the Mercer Hotel in New York City and later recorded at Electric Lady, the song talks about a trip to the city through "ironic lyrics". The concept of the song was mainly inspired in the 1981 painting Arroz con Pollo by Jean-Michel Basquiat. Talking to Apple Music 1, Rosalía stated that she was "just having fun" making the record. Lyrical references include Julio Iglesias, Mike Dean, and Naomi Campbell, among others.

Music video
Rosalía shared a preview of the music video on 23 February 2022. The video itself premiered on 24 February on YouTube. It was directed by Tanu Muino and produced by UnderWonder Content in partnership with Canada, marking the second collaboration between the singer and Muino after "Juro Que". It was filmed in a single day in a dancing studio in Madrid in November 2021. It features a red-haired Rosalía in a dancing studio with a large amount of dancers, mostly women. Natalia Palomares served as the choreographer. It received comparisons to Gaspar Noé's Climax and Pedro Almodóvar.

Personnel
Credits adapted from Tidal.

Production

 Rosalia Vila Tobella – composition, songwriting, production, vocal production, vocals, drums
 Alejandro Ramírez – composition, songwriting, production, drums
 David Rodríguez – composition, songwriting, recording engineer
 Michael Uzowuru – composition, songwriting, production
 El Guincho – composition, songwriting, production
 Kamaal Fareed –  songwriting, background vocals
 Raúl Alejandro Ocasio – songwriting
 Noah Goldstein – additional production

Technical

 Anthony Vilchis – assistant engineer
 Chris Gehringer – mastering engineer
 Manny Marroquin - mixing engineer
 Zach Peraya – assistant engineer
 Jeremie Inhaber – assistant engineer
 Anthony Vilchis – assistant engineer
 Chris Gehringer – assistant engineer

Charts

Certifications

Release history

References

2022 songs
Columbia Records singles
Rosalía songs
Songs written by Michael Uzowuru
Songs written by Rosalía
Spanish-language songs
Songs written by Q-Tip (musician)
Songs written by el Guincho
Music videos directed by Tanu Muino
Music videos shot in Spain
Reggaeton songs